Geoff Southern is a Jersey politician, and former teacher. He has been a deputy in the States of Jersey since winning a by-election, on 15 February 2002, and has chaired two scrutiny panels.

Biography
Southern was born in Manchester. He graduated from the University of Surrey with a BSc (Hons) Metallurgy and French and had a career as a school teacher at Hautlieu School Jersey and as a homeless support worker.
He is a former president of the Jersey branch of the National Union of Teachers. He is a fan of the American singer-songwriter Tom Waits.

States of Jersey
Southern is one of the founder members of Jersey's only political party, inaugurated to the States of Jersey on 4 July 2014, Reform Jersey. Reform Jersey was originally set up in 2012 to campaign for reforms to Jersey's democratic system. In 2014, following the election to the States of Jersey of Reform Jersey's chairman Sam Mezec, and founding member Nick Le Cornu, the group decided to reconstitute as a political party, in order to campaign for wider principles of social and economic justice.

In the 2008-2011 States assembly, Southern was chairman of the Health, Social Security and Housing scrutiny panel. Leading reviews on income support delivery of service, social housing waiting lists, reviews of benefit levels and the airport and harbours.

Previously, Southern was chairman of the Economic Affairs scrutiny panel and the telecoms privatisation sub-panel and a member of the migration policy scrutiny sub-panel.

He serves on the executive committee of the Jersey branch of the Assemblée parlementaire de la Francophonie.

Electoral history
Southern's first ran for the States of Jersey in the elections for six vacant seats as Senator in October 1996 polling 13th and last with 1,429 votes, then for Deputy in St Helier District No. 3 & 4 in November 1996 polling 7th of 7 with 241 votes. Southern ran again in the October 2005 elections for six vacant seats as Senator; he received 4,724 votes, finishing 13th of the 15 candidates.

He was first elected to the States of Jersey as Deputy of Saint Helier No.2 district in a by election on 15 February 2002 and was subsequently re-elected in November 2002, 2005, 2008, 2011, 2014, and 2018. 

On 5 January 2009 he, and a Jersey Democratic Alliance colleague in the same constituency (Shona Pitman), were charged with breaching Article 39A of the Public Elections (Jersey) Law 2002, which prohibits a candidate or representative from interfering with a person's application for registration to vote, during the November 2008 election. Southern had opposed the introduction of this law when it was debated in the States assembly in 2008, saying that he would "continue to assist people who ask me to help them fill in the form … I am among those who may well be prosecuted under the bureaucratic nonsense of a piece of law". On 20 February 2009, Southern pleaded guilty in Magistrate's Court to breaking the law "by assisting about 70 elderly, infirm or busy people to complete a postal vote application form in the election and/or delivering their completed forms" and he was committed to the Royal Court for sentencing. In mitigation his advocate submitted that the law infringed the human rights of the disabled and infirm to take part in the electoral process and the debate on Article 39A in the States had been flawed. Southern was sentenced to a fine of £10,000 (or twenty weeks' imprisonment in default).

In June 2010, Southern stood in a by-election for a vacant senatorial seat caused by Stuart Syvret's six-month absence from the island, finishing fifth out of nine candidates. In October 2011, Southern was successful in retaining his seat as Deputy for the St Helier No. 2 district.

Party politics
In 2005, Southern was a founding member of the Jersey Democratic Alliance and upon the retirement of Chairman Rev Tony Keogh he was elected to the leadership of that party. His election fomented the split in the party which led to the formation of the short-lived Centre Party.

He was one of two JDA candidates in the 2005 Senatorial elections but neither was unsuccessful. He ran in the Deputy elections the following month as an independent (though remained a member of the party) and retained his seat. In 2006 he stepped down from the chair.

In the 2008 deputies' elections, Southern was one of four JDA candidates elected. When the three other members subsequently left the party and continued to sit as independents, Southern remained the only member of the States assembly formally affiliated to a political party. In August 2011, he announced that he would be standing as an independent in the October 2011 elections.

Political philosophy
Deputy Southern is a committed socialist.

References

External links
- 2005 Senatorial Elections results by Parish
- 2005 St Helier #2 Deputy Results
- Jersey Election Results Archive

Deputies of Jersey
Living people
British socialists
Year of birth missing (living people)
People from Saint Helier
Jersey Democratic Alliance politicians
Jersey academics
Alumni of the University of Surrey